Strawberry was a bus operator founded in 2009. It was initially based in St Helens, Merseyside.

History
The company attracted attention by offering free rides for passengers with red hair for a period.   By March 2010 it operated two routes, with a third planned. In February 2011 it was operating nine routes in addition to works and school services. Three months later it acquired another route, linking St Helens to Ormskirk.

In January 2012, Strawberry merged with South Lancs Travel and moved its operations to the larger operator's depot in Atherton. South Lancs Travel had itself been acquired by D&G Bus, which held shares in Strawberry, shortly before the merge. Strawberry's founder Oliver Howarth became joint operations director of the enlarged company.

See also
List of bus operators of the United Kingdom

References

External links
Strawberry Bus - Web Archive
South Lancs Travel website 

Former bus operators in Greater Manchester
Transport companies established in 2009
Former bus operators in Merseyside